Tuyasy is a rural locality (a village) in Beryozovsky District, Perm Krai, Russia. The population was 171 as of 2010. There are 3 streets.

Geography 
Tuyasy is located 19 km northeast of  Beryozovka (the district's administrative centre) by road. Puzdrino is the nearest rural locality.

References 

Rural localities in Beryozovsky District, Perm Krai